The 38th edition of the annual Vuelta a Venezuela was held from September 26 to October 7, 2002. The stage race started in Maturín, and ended in Caracas. Stage 1 was cancelled.

Stages

2001-09-25 
 Stage 1 was cancelled

2001-09-26: Maturín — Carúpano (182.5 km)

2001-09-27: Carúpano Circuit Race (126 km)

2001-09-28: Cariaco — Puerto la Cruz (160 km)

2001-09-29: Puerto Píritu — Valle de la Pascua (179.2 km)

2001-09-30: Calabozo Circuit Race (121.5 km)

2001-10-01: Calabozo — San Juan de los Morros (136 km)

2001-10-02: San Juan de los Morros — San Carlos (200 km)

2001-10-03: San Carlos — San Felipe (236 km)

2001-10-04: Guama — Guama (22.7 km)

2001-10-04: San Felipe Circuit Race (92 km)

2001-10-05: San Felipe — Valencia (140.9 km)

2001-10-06: Valencia — Ocumare del Tuy (138 km)

2001-10-07: Caracas Circuit Race (99 km)

Final classification

References 
 cyclingnews

Vuelta a Venezuela
Venezuela
Vuelta Venezuela